The Lewis House, built in 1899, is a historic Classical Revival house located at 1002 Third Avenue, South in Fargo, North Dakota. It was listed on the National Register of Historic Places on October 18, 1979. At the time, it was the Minn-Kota Red Cross Chapter Office, which has since moved to 2602 12th Street, North in Fargo.

References

Houses on the National Register of Historic Places in North Dakota
Houses in Fargo, North Dakota
National Register of Historic Places in Cass County, North Dakota
Neoclassical architecture in North Dakota
Houses completed in 1899
1899 establishments in North Dakota
American Red Cross